Dušan Vukajlović (Serbian Cyrillic: Душан Вукајловић; 20 January 1948 – 9 December 1994) was a Serbian poet, author and long-time secretary of the Association of Writers of Serbia.

He was one of thirteen founding members of Serbia's Democratic Party in December 1989 which was the first non-communist opposition party in Serbia since 1945.

References

1948 births
1994 deaths
Writers from Pančevo
Serbian male poets
20th-century Serbian poets
Politicians from Pančevo
Democratic Party (Serbia) politicians
Burials in Bosnia and Herzegovina
Burials at Serbian Orthodox monasteries and churches